Se son rose is a 2018 Italian comedy film directed by Leonardo Pieraccioni.

Cast

References

External links

2018 films
Films directed by Leonardo Pieraccioni
2010s Italian-language films
2018 comedy films
Italian comedy films
Italian romantic comedy films
2010s Italian films